Events in the year 1996 in the Netherlands.

Incumbents
 Monarch: Beatrix
 Prime Minister: Wim Kok

Events
15 July – The 1996 Belgian Air Force Hercules accident at Eindhoven Airport resulted in the death of 34 passengers.
19 October – The Hague Convention on Parental Responsibility and Protection of Children was signed.

Births

3 January – Rianne van Rompaey, fashion model
11 February – Joris Nieuwenhuis, cyclist.
28 February – Marrit Jasper, volleyball player
20 March – Puck Moonen, cyclist.
12 April – Jip van den Bos, racing cyclist.
13 April – Birgit Kos, fashion model 
25 April – Will Grands, record producer, singer and songwriter
14 May – Martin Garrix, DJ and record producer 
24 June – Thomas Ouwejan, footballer
15 July – Vivianne Miedema, footballer
23 August – Berry van Peer, darts player
28 August – Sam van Dijk, basketball player
31 August – Fabio Jakobsen, cyclist.
9 September – Jaïro Riedewald, footballer
10 September – Juliët Lohuis, volleyball player
28 September – Arthur Jussen, pianist
5 October – Sevn Alias, rapper
5 October – Imaan Hammam, model
23 October – Julius van den Berg, cyclist.
26 October – Emma Wortelboer, television presenter 
27 November – Mike Williams, DJ, record producer, musician and remixer

Deaths

5 January – Thung Sin Nio, women's rights activist, physician, economist and politician (b. 1902)
12 January – Bartel Leendert van der Waerden, mathematician (b. 1903)
4 February – John Hugo Loudon, business executive (b. 1905)
14 February – Gied Jaspars, television maker (b. 1939)
24 February – Piet Derksen, businessman (b. 1913)
27 February – Gerrit Berkhoff, chemist (b. 1901)
31 May – Ton de Leeuw, composer (b. 1926)
5 July – Piet Stam, swimmer (b. 1919).
11 July – Florrie Rodrigo, dancer, choreographer, and educator (b. 1893)
19 August – Jurriaan Andriessen, composer (b. 1925)
21 September – Henri Nouwen, Catholic priest, professor, writer and theologian (b. 1932) 
24 September – Jannes van der Wal, draughts player (b. 1956)
2 October – Emiel van Lennep, official (treasurer general), diplomat and Minister of State (b. 1915) 
3 October – Bertus Enklaar, chess player (b. 1943)
23 October – Bernardus Weber, sculptor, draughtsman, and pastellist (b. 1912)
4 December – Albert Winsemius, economist (b. 1910)

Full date missing
Hilbrand J. Groenewold, theoretical physicist, pioneer of the phase-space formulation of quantum mechanics (b. 1910)

References

 
1990s in the Netherlands
Years of the 20th century in the Netherlands
Netherlands
Netherlands